Four United States Navy ships have borne the name Meredith, in honor of Jonathan Meredith.

 , was a  commissioned in 1919 and scrapped in 1936
 , was a  commissioned 1 March 1941 and sunk 15 October 1942
 , was an  commissioned 14 March 1944 and sunk 9 June 1944
 , was a  commissioned 31 December 1945 and transferred to Turkey in 1979

United States Navy ship names